Adam Rainer (1899– 4 March 1950) was the only person in recorded history to have been both a dwarf and a giant. He is believed to have had acromegaly.

Biography

Dwarfism 
Adam Rainer was born in Graz, Austria-Hungary (present day Austria), in 1899. As a child, Rainer was described as very small, thin, and weak. He therefore was refused entry into the Austro-Hungarian Army to take part in the First World War. A typical defining characteristic of dwarfism is an adult height below .

Gigantism 
Several years later, likely as a result of a pituitary tumor that was identified later, Rainer had a dramatic growth spurt. Between his early 20s to early 30s, he gained height at the average rate of 9.14 cm (3.16 in) per year. He went from US shoe size 10 (EUR size 43) at age 19 to size 20 (EUR 57.5) only three years later.

A benign pituitary adenoma was found, which was responsible for the enormous growth. Dr. Oskar Hirsch removed the adenoma. 

Prior to the removal of the tumor, Rainer had already been rendered weak and unable to stand due to his malfunctioning pituitary gland and the rapid growth that resulted. Shortly after the surgery Rainer entered a "home for the aged" where he resided for the remainder of his life.

References

People with dwarfism
People with gigantism
Austrian world record holders
1899 births
1950 deaths
People from Graz